Anastasie Crimca (c. 1550–1629) was a Moldavian Eastern orthodox clergyman, as well as a calligrapher, illuminator, and writer.

Born in Suceava, he was the Metropolitan of Moldavia (1608–1617; 1619–1629) and the founder of Dragomirna Monastery (1609), where he initiated a scriptorium remarkable for the stylistic unity of the work produced over two decades.

The great similarity of the works has caused them to be attributed to Crimca, although some scholars have disputed this. The accepted opinion is that nine codices can be attributed to him: five of these are at Dragomirna Monastery, three are in Bucharest, and the Acts of the Apostles (1610) is in Vienna.
One tetra gospel is in National Library in Warsaw.

He died in Suceava and he is buried in exonarthex of Dragomirna church.

References 

 Turdeanu, E. "Le Métropolite Anastase Crimca et son oeuvre littéraire et artistique (1608-1629)," Revue des études slaves, 29 (1952), 58-65.
 Costea, C. "Ilustraţia de manuscris în mediul cărturăresc al mitropolitului Anastasie Crimcovici : liturghierul," Studii şi cercetări de istoria artei / Seria artă plastică, 43 (1996), 19-35.

External links 
 Dragomirna

1550s births
1629 deaths
Early Modern Romanian writers
People from Suceava
Romanian Orthodox metropolitan bishops
16th-century Romanian people
17th-century Romanian people
Manuscript illuminators